Dice chess can refer to a number of chess variants in which dice are used to alter gameplay; specifically that the moves available to each player are determined by rolling a pair of ordinary six-sided dice. There are many different variations of this form of dice chess. One of them is described here.

Rules

The players alternate rolling the dice and, if possible, moving.  On each die, the 1 represents a pawn, 2 a knight, 3 a bishop, 4 a rook, 5 a queen, and 6 a king.  The player may move either of the pieces indicated on the two dice.  For example, a player rolling a 1 and a 2 may move either a pawn or a knight.  A player who rolls doubles (the same number on both dice) may play any legal move.  Otherwise, standard chess rules apply, with these exceptions:  
 a player who has no legal move with either of the pieces indicated by the dice loses that turn (passed turn); 
 if castling is otherwise legal, a player may castle upon rolling a 4, 6, or doubles; 
 an en passant capture of a pawn is possible only if the player rolls a 1, or doubles, immediately once the opportunity for the en passant capture arises; 
 a player who is in check can only play a legal response to that check (capturing the checking piece, moving the king, or interposing a piece);
 a player who is in check but does not make a roll allowing a legal response to the check loses that turn, but does not automatically lose the game;
 except in the unlikely event that the game ends in a draw pursuant to the standard rules of chess, the game ends when one player either checkmates the opponent or captures the opponent's king.

Sample game

Here is a sample game of dice chess:

White rolls doubles, allowing her to play any move, and selects 1.e4.  Black rolls a 2 and a 3; no bishop move being possible, he plays 1...Nc6.  White rolls a 3 and a 4, and plays 2.Bc4.  Black rolls a 4 and a 5; since no queen move is possible, he must play the only legal rook move, 2...Rb8.  White rolls a 3 and a 6, and plays 3.Bxf7+.  Black rolls a 2 and a 4; since no knight or rook move is a legal response to the check, he must pass.  (Only a 6, or doubles, would have allowed him to move.)  White rolls a 2 and a 4, and chooses 4.Nf3.  (A 3 or 5 would have enabled an immediate win with 4.Bxe8, 4.Qf3 or 4.Qh5#).  Black rolls a 1 and a 3; again, this does not allow a legal response to the check, so he must pass.  White rolls a 2 and a 4, and plays 5.Ng5#, ending the game (see diagram).

Rules variants
There is no standard  for dice chess, and so games called dice chess may have different rules to the ones given here.

For example, in the version of dice chess given on the BrainKing site:
 The players roll only one die.
 Pawns may move from the seventh to the eighth rank not only on a roll of 1 (when they promote to a piece of the player's choice), but also on a roll of 2, 3, 4 or 5 (when they can promote only to the piece specified by the roll).
 There is no check or checkmate. Rather, the goal is to actually capture the king.

Another form of dice chess is Vegas Fun Chess, whose rules are described on The Chess Variant Pages. That site also states that "Pritchard's Encyclopedia of Chess Variants contains descriptions of seven versions of what he calls 'Dice Chess'."

John Gollon, in his book Chess Variations: Ancient, Regional, and Modern, notes three ways in which dice may be used in connection with a game of chess. The most common is similar to that described in the preceding sections. A second way to use dice is to have each player roll one die on each turn, with the number rolled indicating the number of moves to be played. The maximum number of moves that can be played is usually four, so a roll of a 4, 5, or 6 allows the player to make four moves. A third form of the game uses two dice of contrasting colors, with one determining the piece that can move, and the other the number of moves that the piece makes.

History
Anne Sunnucks writes that there is evidence from the literature of the period that dice were used to play chess in Europe between the 11th and 14th centuries, and even earlier in Burma and India. The dice were thrown before each turn to determine the piece to be moved; the same numbering system as set forth above was used (1=pawn, 2=knight, etc.). In the Burmese form of the game, three dice were thrown and each player made three moves at a time. Vladimir Pribylinec writes that the cubes in Cubic Chess move as in orthochess by a symbol uppermost as is described in both editions of Pritchard's Encyclopedia of Chess Variants, first published in 1977. In the variant Protheus cubes are turned on the adjacent squares.

See also
 Chaturaji

References

Chess variants